Møsstrond is a small island village in Vinje Municipality in Vestfold og Telemark county, Norway. The village is located on the island Hovdeøyi which lies in the lake Møsvatn, high up in the mountains just east of Hardangervidda National Park. The village is located on the southern part of the island and it is very rural and isolated. The village has no road connections and is only accessible by boat. There are some scattered settlements surrounding the lake that don't have road connections either, so boats are frequently used on the lake. Møsstrond Church is located in the village and it serves the village and the vast, sparsely populated region surrounding the lake.

References

Vinje
Villages in Vestfold og Telemark